Avrom is a variant form of the masculine given name Abram.

People with the given name Avrom

Avrom Ber Gotlober (1811–1899), Jewish writer, poet, playwright, historian, journalist and educator
Avrom Isaacs, CM (1926–2016), Canadian art dealer
Avrom Stencl (1897–1983), Yiddish poet
Avrom Yanovsky (1911–1979), Canadian editorial cartoonist

Hebrew masculine given names